Hoseyn Aliabad or Hoseynaliabad may refer to:

Hoseynaliabad, Fars, a village in Fars Province, Iran
Hoseyn Aliabad, Lorestan, a village in Lorestan Province, Iran
Hoseynaliabad, Razavi Khorasan, a village in Razavi Khorasan Province, Iran